Succisella inflexa is a species of flowering plant belonging to the family Caprifoliaceae.

Its native range is Europe.

References

Caprifoliaceae